The moral influence or moral example theory of atonement, developed or most notably propagated by Abelard (1079–1142), is an alternative to Anselm's satisfaction theory of atonement. Abelard focused on changing man's perception of God as not offended, harsh, and judgmental, but as loving. According to Abelard, "Jesus died as the demonstration of God's love," a demonstration which can change the hearts and minds of the sinners, turning back to God.

Doctrine

Abelard
It was not until Anselm, with his satisfaction theory of atonement, that a theory of atonement was specifically articulated. The moral influence theory was developed, or most notably propagated, by Abelard (1079-1142), as an alternative to Anselm's satisfaction theory.

Abelard not only rejected the idea of Jesus' death as a ransom paid to the devil, which turned the Devil into a rival god, but also objected to the idea that Jesus' death was a "debt paid to God's honor." He also objected to the emphasis on God's judgment, and the idea that God changed his mind after the sinner accepted Jesus' sacrificial death, which was not easily reconcilable with the idea of "the perfect, impassible God [who] does not change." Abelard focused on changing man's perception of God as not offended, harsh, and judgmental, but as loving. According to Abelard, "Jesus died as the demonstration of God's love," a demonstration which can change the hearts and minds of the sinners, turning back to God.

Beilby and Eddy note that Abelard was "challenged in his views by Bernard of Clairvaux, condemned by the Council of Sens (1140), and eventually excommunicated. His general approach to the atonement, however, has lived on in various forms throughout the last millennium."

Moral example theory 

A related theory, the "moral example theory," was developed by Faustus Socinus (1539-1604) in his work De Jesu Christo servatore (1578). He rejected the idea of "vicarious satisfaction." According to Socinus, Jesus' death offers us a perfect example of self-sacrificial dedication to God."

A number of theologians see "example" (or "exemplar") theories of the atonement as variations of the moral influence theory. Wayne Grudem, however, argues that "Whereas the moral influence theory says that Christ's death teaches us how much God loves us, the example theory says that Christ's death teaches us how we should live." Grudem identifies the Socinians as supporters of the example theory.

Influence on Reformation thought
During the Protestant Reformation in Western Christianity, the majority of the Reformers strongly rejected the moral influence view of the atonement in favour of penal substitution, a highly forensic modification of the honor-oriented Anselmian satisfaction model. Fausto Sozzini's Socinian arm of the Reformation maintained a belief in the moral influence view of the atonement. Socinianism was an early form of Unitarianism, and the Unitarian Church today maintains a moral influence view of the atonement, as do many liberal Protestant theologians of the modern age.

During the 18th century, versions of the moral influence view found overwhelming support among German theologians, most notably the Enlightenment philosopher Immanuel Kant. In the 19th and 20th century, it has been popular among liberal Protestant thinkers in the Anglican, Methodist, Lutheran and Presbyterian churches, including the Anglican theologian Hastings Rashdall. A number of English theological works in the last hundred years have advocated and popularized the moral influence theory of atonement.

A strong division has remained since the Reformation between liberal Protestants (who typically adopt a moral influence view) and conservative Protestants (who typically adopt the penal substitution theory). Both sides tend to believe that their position is taught by the Bible.

Notes

References

Citations

Sources 

 

 Stephen Finlan, Problems With Atonement: The Origins Of, And Controversy About, The Atonement Doctrine (Liturgical Press 2005) 

 

 Vincent Taylor, The Cross of Christ (Macmillan 1956)

Further reading

External links
 "Historical Theories of Atonement" Theopedia gives a brief treatment of the historical and modern theories of atonement from a Calvinistic perspective.
 "The Moral Theory of Atonement" Website gives an explanation of this perspective with common criticisms listed.
 "The Moral Theory" section III.9.3 from Charles Hodge's Systematic Theology, describing the view and arguing against it.

Atonement in Christianity
Christian terminology
Catholic theology and doctrine